Nicylla is a monotypic genus of Sumatran jumping spiders containing the single species, Nicylla sundevalli. It was first described by Tamerlan Thorell in 1890, and is only found on Sumatra. Briefly considered a synonym of Thiania, it was elevated back to genus status in 2017.

Thiania, circumscribed to include Nicylla, is placed in the tribe Euophryini, part of the Salticoida clade of the subfamily Salticinae.

References

Monotypic Salticidae genera
Salticidae
Spiders of Asia
Spiders of Hawaii
Taxa named by Tamerlan Thorell